Faye J. Ringel is an American professor emeritus of Humanities at the United States Coast Guard Academy and an author.

Life
Ringel received a Bachelor of Arts in Comparative Literature from Brandeis University and a Ph.D. from Brown University in Comparative Literature with Patterns of the Hero and the Quest in 1979. She is also a performer and teacher of traditional music (Hot Chestnuts: Old Songs, Endearing Charms).

Ringel was promoted to Professor Emeritus at the United States Coast Guard Academy after 20 years of service in 2010.

Private life
She married Paul Hazel, a novelist, in 1990 but later was divorced.

Work
Faye Ringel, New England's Gothic Literature: History and Folklore of the Supernatural (1995)
Hot Chestnuts

External links
Bio, USCG Academy
Faye's Livejournal

References

Year of birth missing (living people)
Living people
20th-century American writers
American humanitarians
Women humanitarians
United States Coast Guard Academy people
Brandeis University alumni
Brown University alumni
H. P. Lovecraft scholars
21st-century American writers
20th-century American women writers
21st-century American women writers